Wyloo Station, often referred to as Wyloo and previously known as Peake, is a pastoral lease that operates as a sheep station and cattle station.

Peake Station was established prior to 1897 and was trading in sheep at that time. The station was owned by the McGrath family in 1907 when the area received good rains following a cyclone hitting the coast.
 
The Wyloo Pastoral Company was established in 1927 when the company was registered with £10,000 of capital raised on 10,000 shares. The company acquired the  property known as Peake Station later the same year. Peake was renamed shortly afterwards to Wyloo. George Monger was appointed manager of Wyloo and Hardey Junction Station the following year, following substantial improvements. Mervyn Forrest was a part owner of both Wyloo and Minderoo Stations in 1928.

A new shearing shed was built in 1935 at Loghut, an outstation of Wyloo; the 12-stand shed put through a total of 29,000 sheep during shearing that year. In 1936 a total of 20,770 sheep were shorn after a dry season.

About  was fenced for sheep with the remainder for cattle. Stock were watered by several permanent and semi-permanent waterholes along with 30 wells and 25 bores. The station had a stone homestead, men's quarters, two drafting yards and two shearing sheds. It was advertised as being capable of carrying 30,000 sheep and 2,000 cattle, but after a long drought was only carrying 2,000 sheep and 1,000 cattle.

 
Wyloo has been owned by the Pensini family since 1976, but the western half of the property was sold off in early 2001. The eastern half of the property, now called Cheela Plains, is a cattle station run by Evan Pensini.

See also
List of ranches and stations

References

Pastoral leases in Western Australia
Stations (Australian agriculture)
Pilbara